KGOW (1560 AM) is a Vietnamese language terrestrial full service radio station based in Houston, Texas, United States, owned by Gow Media, LLC. KGOW's programming schedule is leased to a third party group that utilizes the broadcast day to air Vietnamese focused programming for southwest Houston, Bellaire, and the areas in southwest Harris County where 1560's signal is strongest. Viet Radio programming is simulcasted on 1480 KNGO Dallas.

The daytime transmitter site is located in Lochridge, Texas, across from Brazos Bend State Park.  The nighttime transmitter site is in western Harris County, halfway between Katy, Texas and Hockley, Texas. KGOW used its nighttime authorization at 15 kilowatts full-time, as the 46 kilowatt daytime site was damaged by floodwaters during a flooding event in 2016, then again in Hurricane Harvey. KGOW did not operate on the day power for over one year, authorized by the Federal Communications Commission through a Special Temporary Authority that allows KGOW to operate at reduced power until which time the daytime site could be repaired. This occurred in March 2018.

The studios are located in Uptown Houston one block from The Galleria. The facility originated in Port Lavaca, Texas and began operations in 1961 as KGUL, which remained as such until 1996, when the RAFTT Corporation purchased it and moved the facility into the Houston metropolitan area, licensed to Bellaire.

History
1560 first appeared in south Texas as KGUL, based in Port Lavaca, Texas. It was, at one time, a sister station to 95.9 (now KHMC) and 93.3 (now KNAL).

1270 KIOX, licensed to Bay City, Texas, through the ill-advised actions of its owner at the time, moved KIOX from Bay City to Stafford Texas without proper FCC permission, wishing to capitalize on the money that could be commanded from having the signal closer to the Houston market, and directly within the exploding suburbs of Stafford, Missouri City, and Sugar Land. The station then applied and was granted a call set change to KFCC. After the Federal Communications Commission investigated the illegal move, KFCC's license was deleted, and the facility went dark. After it was clear that KFCC was permanently deleted, the principals secured a front "real party in interest" to take the KGUL Port Lavaca facility to Houston instead. Now KILE, it originally operated with 800 watts from just south of the 610 South Loop, then later 5,000 watts on a simple directional system, retaining the 800 watts for nighttime operation. KILE featured programming with a Multi-Language talk radio format, and was the only one in the Houston area to broadcast in many languages. This format remained in place until August 1, 2007, when Gow Media was ready to begin transmission testing from the new 46 kilowatt daytime and 15 kilowatt nighttime facilities. As a stunt, Gow Media began airing classic hits on KILE for the testing purposes. After testing concluded, a sports/guy talk format debuted on KILE (now as KGOW) on August 20, 2007, under the name of "1560 The Game", and becoming the flagship station of Gow Media and Sporting News Radio. After a few months on the air, KGOW dropped the guy talk portion of the format and focused solely on sports talk and game time play by play for various sporting events around Houston.

The sports format ended on September 30, 2017. The former "SB Nation 1560" was moved to FM, on relay translator K231CN Houston as "Sports Map 94.1". K231CN is allegedly fed by KGOW sister station KFNC's HD2 subchannel, though no evidence has ever been found that KFNC is actually broadcasting an HD2 channel.

Facility Operations
During daytime hours, KGOW transmits from near Rosharon, TX, SSW of Houston, with 46,000 watts. At night, KGOW transmits from near Cypress-Katy, TX, NW of Houston, with 15,000 watts. The highly directive nature of both the daytime antenna array (six towers, with high efficiency) and the nighttime antenna array (nine towers, with standard efficiency) means that the apparent power towards Houston is greatly in excess of the licensed power, about the equivalent of 857,000 watts days and 197,000 watts nights (when compared to the 1,000 watt non-directional reference antenna for this class of station, Class B). This effect is shared by a number of other Class B stations in the Houston market. Houston has no allocated Class A stations (the only Class A stations in Texas are allocated to Dallas, KRLD, 1080 kHz; Fort Worth, WBAP, 820 kHz; and San Antonio, WOAI, 1200 kHz).

External links

FCC History Cards for KGOW

 http://boards.radio-info.com/smf/index.php?action=printpage;topic=192585.0
 http://transition.fcc.gov/Bureaus/Mass_Media/Orders/1998/fcc98073.txt

GOW
Radio stations established in 1961
1961 establishments in Texas
Asian-American culture in Houston
Vietnamese-American culture in Texas
GOW